The finals and the qualifying heats of the Men's 4×200 metres Freestyle Relay event at the 1993 FINA Short Course World Championships were held in Palma de Mallorca, Spain.

Final

See also
1992 Men's Olympic Games 4x200m Freestyle Relay
1993 Men's European LC Championships 4x200m Freestyle Relay

References
 Results

R